Stress testing is a form of deliberately intense or thorough testing, used to determine the stability of a given system, critical infrastructure or entity. It involves testing beyond normal operational capacity, often to a breaking point, in order to observe the results.

Reasons can include:
 to determine breaking points or safe usage limits
 to confirm mathematical model is accurate enough in predicting breaking points or safe usage limits
 to confirm intended specifications are being met
 to determine modes of failure (how exactly a system fails)
 to test stable operation of a part or system outside standard usage

Reliability engineers often test items under expected stress or even under accelerated stress in order to determine the operating life of the item or to determine modes of failure.

The term "stress" may have a more specific meaning in certain industries, such as material sciences, and therefore stress testing may sometimes have a technical meaning – one example is in fatigue testing for materials.

In animal biology, there are various forms of biological stress and biological stress testing, such as the cardiac stress test in humans, often administered for biomedical reasons. In exercise physiology, training zones are often determined in relation to metabolic stress protocols, quantifying energy production, oxygen uptake, or blood chemistry regimes.

Computing

Materials

Critical infrastructure

Finance

Medical

Cardiac

Childbirth

See also
Highly accelerated life test, generally for electronic equipment
Fatigue (material)
Stress (mechanics)
Stress measures, ways to quantify mechanical stress
Structural testing
List of bank stress tests, lists major bank stress testing programs with links to details by year

References

Tests
Broad-concept articles